There have been three baronetcies created for persons with the surname Carmichael, two in the Baronetage of Nova Scotia and one in the Baronetage of the United Kingdom.

The Carmichael Baronetcy, of Westraw in the County of Lanark, was created in the Baronetage of Nova Scotia on 17 July 1627. For more information on this creation, see Lord Carmichael.

The Carmichael, later Carmichael-Baillie Baronetcy, of Bonington in the County of Lanark, was created in the Baronetage of Nova Scotia in circa 1676. For more information on this creation, see Carmichael-Baillie baronets.

The Carmichael-Smyth, later Carmichael Baronetcy, of Nutwood in the County of Surrey, was created in the Baronetage of the United Kingdom on 25 August 1821 for the colonial administrator Sir James Carmichael-Smyth. He was the eldest son of the Scottish physician and medical writer James Carmichael Smyth, the only son of Thomas Carmichael of Balmedie and Margaret Smyth of Athenry. The second Baronet discontinued the use of the surname Smyth in 1841. The third Baronet, James Morse Carmichael, was a Liberal politician. He claimed the dormant earldom of Hyndford, a claim that was rejected. He was unmarried and the baronetcy became extinct on his death in 1902.

Carmichael baronets of Westraw (1627)
see Lord Carmichael

Carmichael, later Carmichael-Baillie baronets of Bonington (c. 1676)
see Carmichael-Baillie baronets

Carmichael-Smyth, later Carmichael baronets of Nutwood (1821)
Sir James Carmichael-Smyth, 1st Baronet (1780–1838) 
Sir James Robert Carmichael, 2nd Baronet (1817–1883) 
Sir James Morse Carmichael, 3rd Baronet (1844–1902)

References

External links 
Burke, John (2001). Peter de Vere Beauclerk-Dewar. ed. Burke's Landed Gentry of Great Britain. pp. 190. .

Baronetcies in the Baronetage of Nova Scotia
Extinct baronetcies in the Baronetage of the United Kingdom
1627 establishments in the British Empire